For the former Formula-1 driver see Nelson Piquet Souto Maior
Soutomaior is a municipality in the province of Pontevedra, autonomous community of Galicia, Spain. According to the INE, the population in 2011 was 7,223 inhabitants.

References

Municipalities in the Province of Pontevedra